Centralia station is an Amtrak intercity train station in Centralia, Illinois, United States. The station existed as little more than a sheltered platform until an unstaffed waiting area was built in 2003. The new $100,611 station was funded by the city, the Centralia Foundation, the Centralia Area Development Association and the Great American Stations Foundation. The station is a flag stop on the City of New Orleans route, served only when passengers have tickets to and from the station.

References

External links

Centralia Amtrak Station (USA Rail Guide -- Train Web)

Amtrak stations in Illinois
Amtrak Station
Buildings and structures in Marion County, Illinois
Transportation in Marion County, Illinois